Skowronek  is a settlement in the administrative district of Gmina Lubichowo, within Starogard County, Pomeranian Voivodeship, in northern Poland. The name means "lark" in Polish.

For details of the history of the region, see History of Pomerania.

References

Skowronek